Khinchagov is an Ossetian masculine surname; its feminine counterpart is Khinchagova. It may refer to:

 Deviko Khinchagov (born 1987), Russian football player
 Ruslan Khinchagov (born 1970), Uzbekistani wrestler
 Vadim Khinchagov (born 1981), Russian football midfielder

Ossetian-language surnames